Kenneth Kent Mackenzie (1877–1934) was a lawyer and amateur botanist who wrote extensively on the genus Carex in North America.

Taxa

Cyperaceae
He described the following taxa in the family Cyperaceae (sedges); alternative combinations are indented.

Carex abramsii Mack.
Carex abrupta Mack.
Carex abscondita Mack.
Carex acutinella Mack.
Carex agglomerata Mack.
Carex aggregata Mack.
= Carex sparganioides var. aggregata (Mack.) Gleason
Carex agrostoides Mack.
Carex albonigra Mack.
Carex allegheniensis Mack.
Carex amphigena Mack.
Carex amplectens Mack.
Carex leersii var. angustata (J.Carey) Mack.
Carex angustior Mack.
Carex arctaeformis Mack.
Carex arctiformis Mack.
= Carex canescens subsp. arctiformis (Mack.) Calder & Roy L.Taylor
Carex artitecta Mack.
Carex atrosquama Mack.
= Carex atrata subsp. atrosquama (Mack.) Hultén
= Carex atrata var. atrosquama (Mack.) Cronquist
Carex austrina Mack.
Carex autumnalis Mack.
Carex aztecica Mack.
Carex biltmoreana Mack.
Carex brachyglossa Mack.
Carex brainerdii Mack.
Carex brevicaulis Mack.
= Carex deflexa var. brevicaulis (Mack.) B.Boivin
Carex breviligulata Mack.
Carex brevior (Dewey) Mack.
Carex brevisquama Mack.
Carex bulbostylis Mack.
Carex bushii Mack.
Carex caesariensis Mack.
Carex camporum Mack.
Carex chihuahuensis Mack.
Carex chlorophila Mack.
Carex colorata Mack.
Carex concinnoides Mack.
Carex conspecta Mack.
Carex convoluta Mack.
Carex cryptolepis Mack.
Carex cumulata Mack.
Carex cusickii Mack. ex Piper & Beattie
Carex davyi Mack.
Carex debiliformis Mack.
Carex dudleyi (Mack.) 
Carex egglestonii Mack.
Carex egregia Mack.
Carex epapillosa Mack.
= Carex heteroneura var. epapillosa (Mack.) F.J.Herm.
Carex exserta Mack.
Carex farwellii Mack.
Carex fernandezensis Mack. ex G.A.Wheeler
Carex festivella Mack.
= Carex macloviana subsp. festivella (Mack.) Á.Löve & D.Löve
Carex sect. Firmiculmes (Kük.) Mack.
Carex fissa Mack.
Carex fissuricola Mack.
Carex flaccifolia Mack.
Carex fracta Mack.
Carex fulvescens Mack.
Carex fuscotincta Mack.
Carex geophila Mack.
Carex gigas Mack.
Carex glacialis Mack.
Carex gracilior Mack.
Carex pachystachya var. gracilis Mack.
Carex harfordii Mack.
Carex heliophila Mack.
= Carex inops subsp. heliophila (Mack.) Crins
= Carex pensylvanica subsp. heliophila (Mack.) W.A.Weber
Carex helleri Mack.
Carex hirsutella Mack.
= Carex complanata subsp. hirsutella (Mack.) R.T.Clausen
Carex hirtifolia Mack.
Carex sect. Hispidae Mack. ex Reznicek
Carex holmiana Mack.
Carex howei Mack.
Carex impressa Mack.
Carex incurviformis Mack.
= Carex maritima var. incurviformis (Mack.) B.Boivin
Carex integra Mack.
Carex involucratella Mack.
Carex castanea var. knieskernii Mack.
Carex laevivaginata (Kük.) Mack.
Carex lancifructus Mack.
Carex laricina Mack. ex Bright
= Carex muricata var. laricina (Mack. ex Bright) Gleason
Carex latebrosa Mack.
Carex laxior Mack.
Carex leiophylla Mack.
= Carex sabulosa subsp. leiophylla (Mack.) A.E.Porsild
Carex leporinella Mack.
Carex leptopoda Mack. in Rydb.
= Carex deweyana subsp. leptopoda (Mack.) Calder & Roy L.Taylor
= Carex deweyana var. leptopoda (Mack.) B.Boivin
Carex microptera var. limnophila (F.J.Herm.) Dorn
Carex longa Mack.
Carex sect. Longicaules Mack. ex Reznicek
Carex longii Mack.
Carex lunelliana Mack.
Carex luridiformis Mack. ex Reznicek & M.S.González Elizondo
Carex macrosperma Mack.
Carex magnifolia Mack.
Carex mediterranea Mack.
Carex longii subsp. meridionalis (Kük.) Luceño & M.Alves
Carex merritt-fernaldii Mack.
Carex mesochorea Mack.
= Carex cephalophora var. mesochorea (Mack.) Gleason
Carex microptera Mack.
= Carex macloviana var. microptera (Mack.) B.Boivin
Carex microrhyncha Mack.
Carex miserabilis Mack.
Carex mohriana Mack.
Carex molesta Mack.
= Carex brevior var. molesta (Mack.) F.C.Gates
Carex montereyensis Mack.
Carex multicostata Mack.
Carex nelsonii Mack.
Carex neomexicana Mack.
Carex neurophora Mack. in Abrams
Carex normalis Mack.
Carex nubicola Mack.
Carex oklahomensis Mack.
= Carex stipata var. oklahomensis (Mack.) Gleason
Carex olympica Mack.
Carex onusta Mack.
Carex ormantha Mack.
Carex pachycarpa Mack.
Carex paucicostata Mack.
Carex paucifructus Mack.
Carex perglobosa Mack.
Carex perstricta Mack.
= Carex schiedeana var. perstricta (Mack.) F.J.Herm.
Carex piperi Mack. ex Piper & Beattie
Carex pityophila Mack.
Carex plana Mack.
Carex platylepis Mack.
Carex praeceptorum Mack.
Carex projecta Mack.
Carex proposita Mack.
Carex purpurifera Mack.
= Carex laxiflora var. purpurifera (Mack.) Gleason
Carex rectior Mack.
Carex rhomalea Mack.
Carex richii Mack.
Carex rugosperma Mack.
= Carex tonsa var. rugosperma (Mack.) Crins
Carex rusbyi Mack.
= Carex vallicola var. rusbyi (Mack.) F.J.Herm.
Carex ruthii Mack.
= Carex muricata var. ruthii (Mack.) Gleason
Carex salinaeformis Mack.
Carex saximontana Mack.
= Carex backii var. saximontana (Mack.) B.Boivin
Carex scabriuscula Mack.
Carex scirpiformis Mack.
= Carex scirpoidea var. scirpiformis (Mack.) O'Neill & Duman
Carex sheldonii Mack.
Carex simulata Mack.
= Carex praegracilis var. simulata (Mack.) B.Boivin
Carex smalliana Mack.
Carex stellata Mack.
= Carex schiedeana var. stellata (Mack.) F.J.Herm.
Carex stenochlaena (Holm) Mack.
Carex stenoptera Mack.
Carex sub-bracteata Mack.
Carex suborbiculata Mack. in Abrams
Carex substricta Mack.
Carex swanii Mack.
Carex teneraeformis Mack.
Carex townsendii Mack.
= Carex echinata subsp. townsendii (Mack.) Reznicek
Carex tracyi Mack.
Carex tumulicola Mack.
Carex uberior Mack.
Carex unilateralis Mack.
= Carex athrostachya var. unilateralis (Mack.) B.Boivin
Carex viridiflora Mack.
Carex viridior Mack. in Abrams
Carex wiegandii Mack.
Carex wootonii Mack.
Cymophyllus Mack.
Cymophyllus fraseri (Andrews) Mack.
Kobresia macrocarpa Clokey ex Mack.
= Kobresia bellardi var. macrocarpa (Clokey ex Mack.) H.D.Harr.
Kobresia simpliciuscula Mack.

Other families
In other families, he described the following taxa:

Acanthaceae
Gerardia flava var. calycosa (Mack. & Bush) Steyerm.
Adiantaceae
Pellaea atropurpurea var. bushii Mack.
Alismataceae
Echinodorus cordifolius var. lanceolatus (Engelm.) Mack. & Bush
Sagittaria brevirostra Mack. & Bush
= Sagittaria engelmanniana subsp. brevirostra (Mack. & Bush) Bogin
Apiaceae
Pseudotaenidia montana Mack.
Pseudotaenidia Mack.
= Taenidia montana (Mack.) Cronquist
Compositae
Aster parviceps Mack. & Bush in Mack.
Senecio pseudotomentosus Mack. & Bush
= Packera paupercula var. pseudotomentosa (Mack. & Bush) R.R.Kowal
Senecio semicordatus Mack. & Bush
= Senecio pseudaureus subsp. semicordatus (Mack. & Bush) G.W.Douglas & Ruyle-Douglas
= Packera pseudaurea var. semicordata (Mack. & Bush) Trock & T.M.Barkley
= Senecio aureus var. semicordatus (Mack. & Bush) Greenm.
Smallanthus Mack.
Smallanthus uvedalia (L.) Mack.
Solidago [infragen.unranked] Argutae Mack.
= Solidago subsect. Argutae (Mack.) G.L.Nesom
= Solidago ser. Argutae (Mack.) G.L.Nesom
Solidago edisoniana Mack.
Solidago harperi Mack. ex Small
Solidago longipetiolata Mack. & Bush
= Solidago nemoralis subsp. longipetiolata (Mack. & Bush) G.W.Douglas
= Solidago nemoralis var. longipetiolata (Mack. & Bush) E.J.Palmer & Steyerm.
Solidago milleriana Mack. ex Small
Solidago [infragen.unranked] Nemorales Mack.
= Solidago subsect. Nemorales (Mack.) G.L.Nesom
Solidago notabilis Mack.
Solidago [infragen.unranked] Odorae Mack.
= Solidago subsect. Odorae (Mack.) G.L.Nesom
= Solidago ser. Odorae (Mack.) Semple
Solidago tarda Mack. ex Small
Vernonia interior var. baldwinii (Torr.) Mack. & Bush in Mack.
Vernonia interior var. drummondii Mack. & Bush
Xanthium inflexum Mack. & Bush
Boraginaceae
Macromeria thurberi (A.Gray) Mack.
Onosmodium hispidissimum Mack.
= Onosmodium molle subsp. hispidissimum (Mack.) B.Boivin
= Onosmodium molle var. hispidissimum (Mack.) Cronquist
= Onosmodium virginianum var. hirsutum Mack.
Onosmodium bejariense var. hispidissimum (Mack.) B.L.Turner
Onosmodium hispidissimum var. macrospermum Mack. & Bush
Onosmodium occidentale Mack.
= Onosmodium bejariense var. occidentale (Mack.) B.L.Turner
= Onosmodium molle subsp. occidentale (Mack.) Cochrane
= Onosmodium molle subsp. occidentale (Mack.) Cochrane
= Onosmodium molle var. occidentale (Mack.) I.M.Johnst.
Onosmodium subsetosum Mack. & Bush in Small
= Onosmodium molle subsp. subsetosum (Mack. & Bush) Cochrane
= Onosmodium bejariense var. subsetosum (Mack. & Bush) B.L.Turner
= Onosmodium molle var. subsetosum (Mack. & Bush) Cronquist
Onosmodium occidentale var. sylvestre Mack.
Campanulaceae
Lobelia spicata var. leptostachys Mack. & Bush in Mack.
Caryophyllaceae
Geocarpon Mack.
Geocarpon minimum Mack.
Chenopodiaceae
Chenopodium album var. berlandieri (Moq.) Mack. & Bush
Convallariaceae
Uvularia nitida Mack.
Convolvulaceae
Convolvulus sepium var. fraterniflorus Mack. & Bush
= Convolvulus fraterniflorus (Mack. & Bush) Mack. & Bush
= Calystegia fraterniflora (Mack. & Bush) Brummitt
= Calystegia sepium var. fraterniflora (Mack. & Bush) R.H.Mohlenbrock
= Calystegia silvatica subsp. fraterniflora (Mack. & Bush) Brummitt
Ericaceae
Gaylussacia baccata var. glaucocarpa Mack.
Vaccinium caesariense Mack.
= Vaccinium corymbosum f. caesariense (Mack.) Camp
Fabaceae
Lespedeza acuticarpa Mack. & Bush
Lespedeza manniana Mack. & Bush
Lespedeza neglecta Mack. & Bush
Lespedeza violacea var. prairea Mack. & Bush
Lespedeza simulata Mack. & Bush
Haloragaceae
Proserpinaca intermedia Mack.
Iridaceae
Iris foliosa Mack. & Bush
Juncaceae
Juncus coriaceus Mack.
Juncus longicaudatus (Engelm. ex A.Gray) Mack.
Lamiaceae
Scutellaria cordifolia var. pilosissima Mack. & Bush
Onagraceae
Oenothera strigosa Mack. & Bush
= Oenothera biennis var. strigosa Rydb. in Mack.
Onagra argillicola Mack.
= Oenothera argillicola Mack.
= Oenothera biennis f. argillicola (Mack.) B.Boivin
Poaceae
Elymus canadensis var. robustus Mack. & Bush in Mack.
Hystrix elymoides Mack. & Bush in Mack.
Muhlenbergia polystachya Mack. & Bush
Polygonaceae
Polygonum aviculare var. littorale (Link) Mack. & Bush
Portulacaceae
Portulaca neglecta Mack. & Bush
Ranunculaceae
Delphinium nortonianum Mack. & Bush
= Delphinium azureum var. nortonianum (Mack. & Bush) E.J.Palmer & Steyerm.
= Delphinium carolinianum var. nortonianum (Mack. & Bush) L.M.Perry
Ranunculus sicaeformis Mack. & Bush
Rosaceae
Crataegus mackenzii Sarg. in Mack.
Prunus lanata (Sudw.) Mack. & Bush
Salicaceae
Salix cordata var. missouriensis Mack. & Bush in Mack.
Saxifragaceae
Heuchera puberula Mack. & Bush
= Heuchera parviflora var. puberula (Mack. & Bush) E.F.Wells
Saxifraga incurva Mack. ex Ser.
Scrophulariaceae
Aureolaria calycosa (Mack. & Bush) Pennell
Dasistoma calycosum Mack. & Bush
Gerardia calycosa (Mack. & Bush) Fernald
= Gerardia flava var. calycosa (Mack. & Bush) Steyerm.
Solanaceae
Physalis missouriensis Mack. & Bush
= Physalis pubescens var. missouriensis (Mack. & Bush) Waterf.
Physalis subglabrata Mack. & Bush
= Physalis longifolia var. subglabrata (Mack. & Bush) Cronquist
= Physalis virginiana var. subglabrata (Mack. & Bush) Waterf.
Ulmaceae
Celtis mississippiensis var. pumila (Pursh) Mack. & Bush

References
 

American taxonomists
 01
1877 births
1934 deaths
Botanists with author abbreviations
20th-century American botanists